Blaž Kavčič was the defending champion, but he lost to Paolo Lorenzi 6–4, 1–6, 4–6 in the quarterfinals.
Rui Machado won in the final against Grega Žemlja 6–3, 6–0.

Seeds

Draw

Finals

Top half

Bottom half

References
Main Draw
Qualifying Draw

Rijeka Open - Singles
Rijeka Open